WKPR (1440 AM) was a radio station that served the Kalamazoo, Michigan, area of the United States.

WKPR Kalamazoo began its broadcast life in 1960. An unusual result of the Federal Communications Commission (FCC) hearing ahead of its creation was that two radio station licenses were granted at the same time: WKPR (1420 kHz), Kalamazoo, and WDOW (1440 kHz), a new service to Dowagiac. Both stations were constructed in 1960. They remained affiliates for many years. WKPR programming was a mix of Christian music and Bible teaching. WDOW programming was similar, but did have secular music segments at some times of day. In the late 1990s, WDOW (by then an AM/FM station) was sold, and by 2012, WDOW and WDOW-FM had different owners. At the same time, WKPR had been looking for a way to increase in power. This was not feasible at 1420 kHz. However, a substantial power increase would work at 1440 kHz. The engineers found that the former affiliate WDOW (1440 kHz) would need to be moved to Kalamazoo. Overtures were made to the owner of WDOW (1440 kHz). A sale agreement was made. Upon FCC approval, WKPR relinquished 1420 kHz and began broadcasting on 1440 kHz at the Kalamazoo location. Early in 2012, power went from 1,000 watts to 2,700 watts. Late in 2012, WKPR extended its programming further through the purchase and construction of an FM translator. The system was engineered so that the translator could be located at the WKPR site. The FM translator (W286AU) located at 105.1 FM simulcasted 24 hours a day with WKPR. WKPR has always been a sister station to WFUR in Grand Rapids.

As of late July 2022, the 105.1 FM simulcast was broken, and a small country music station out of Grand Rapids called "Jethro FM" began broadcasting on it.
As of early August 2022, WKPR was reported as being silent.

The license was surrendered to the FCC and cancelled on January 10, 2023.

References

Michiguide.com - WKPR History

External links
FCC Station Search Details: DWKPR (Facility ID: 33280)
FCC History Cards for WKPR (covering 1957-1979)

KPR
KPR
Radio stations established in 1961
Radio stations disestablished in 2023
1961 establishments in Michigan
2023 disestablishments in Michigan
Defunct radio stations in the United States
Defunct religious radio stations in the United States
KPR